Doss High School is a high school located in southwestern Louisville, Kentucky, United States. As of the 2017-2018 school year, there were 1,040 students at the school.

Initial naming
The school was originally proposed as Wisertown High School, in honor of the area of the county in which the school is/was located, but was, instead, named for a former member of the Jefferson County Board of Education. At the time Doss was built, Jefferson County population was growing. The City of Louisville had a separate Board of Education, and the city's population was declining. The two school systems were merged in the mid-1970s.

Start up
The school was built to relieve overcrowding from Butler, Fairdale, Western, Pleasure Ridge Park and Valley High Schools. The building opened in the Fall of 1967 at 7601 Saint Andrews Church Road. It began with the 7th, 8th, and 9th grades. The first graduating class was in 1971. The first class to complete grades 7 through 12 was in 1973.

Magnet programs
During the 1990s as the Jefferson County (KY) Public Schools moved their Career and Technical Education Programs into the local high schools Doss became the recipient of three magnet programs: Cosmetology, Early Childhood Education, and Pre-Engineering. Currently, Doss is a Business and Information Technology (BIT) themed school.  Through its partnership with Class Act Federal Credit Union, the school has the first student-run credit union branch in the county. Students train at Class Act's Main Branch over the summer. During the school year Students handle all operations in the Credit Union under the supervision of a team composed of a Qualified Faculty Coordinator and a Branch Coordinator employed by Class Act.  Students can major in accounting, banking and financial services, entrepreneurship, and management in the "Class Act Academy of Business and Finance."

On October 28, 2016, Doss High School announced a new Manufacturing Engineering Technology magnet program.

Athletics
The school athletic complex has three gymnasiums with the main gymnasium, the Leon Mudd Athletic Center, which seats a maximum of 1,800 people. Also, the Hayward Shartzer Stadium, the football stadium with a running track, which seats a maximum of 2,500 people. Also within the athletic complex are baseball and softball fields and tennis courts.

Notable alumni
Notable alumni of Doss High School include:
 Derek Anderson, former NBA basketball player
 Larry Birkhead, photojournalist, best known as the father of Anna Nicole Smith's baby, Dannielynn
 LaVell Boyd, NFL, football player
 Steve Pence, Lt. Governor of Kentucky, Class of 1971
 Isaac Sowells, NFL, football player
 Tony Williams, former professional basketball player, former head coach of Doss

See also
 Public schools in Louisville, Kentucky

References

External links
 Doss High School website

Jefferson County Public Schools (Kentucky)
Public high schools in Kentucky
1967 establishments in Kentucky
Educational institutions established in 1967
High schools in Louisville, Kentucky